The 1973 National League Championship Series was played between the New York Mets and the Cincinnati Reds from October 6 to 10. New York won the series three games to two and advanced to the World Series, where they lost to the Oakland Athletics in what was the second of three straight world championships for Oakland. The Mets set a record for lowest win percentage by a pennant winner, finishing the regular season with an 82–79 record. However, most of the season was plagued by the injury jinx to their key players. In September they finally got healthy and just in time for the playoffs. The Mets' victory has gone down as one of the greatest upsets in MLB history, as they dominated the heavily favored Big Red Machine.

The 1973 NLCS was marred by a fight that broke out in the fifth inning of the third game, beginning with a tussle between Cincinnati's Pete Rose and New York's Bud Harrelson at second base. Players from both sides joined in a general melee that lasted for several minutes and set off rowdy fan behavior at Shea Stadium in New York. Photographs of the fight, autographed by Rose and Harrelson, are now available at a number of Internet sites.

This was the fifth National League Championship Series in all and the only NLCS between 1970 and 1980 not to feature either the Philadelphia Phillies or the Pittsburgh Pirates. In fact, from 1969 to 1980 the NL East champion was either the Mets, Pirates or the Phillies.

Summary

New York Mets vs. Cincinnati Reds

Game summaries

Game 1

The starting pitchers, New York's Tom Seaver and Cincinnati's Jack Billingham, produced a classic pitchers' duel in Game 1. The Mets threatened in the first, loading the bases with one out, but Cleon Jones grounded into a double play to end the inning. The Mets scored their lone run in the second when Seaver doubled home Bud Harrelson. Seaver was also in control of a normally potent Cincinnati offense, holding the Reds scoreless through seven innings. In the eighth, however, Pete Rose homered off Seaver with one out, and Seaver yielded another solo homer in the ninth to Johnny Bench. The Reds walked off with a 1–0 advantage in the series. Tom Seaver's 13 strikeout performance would be later matched by Jacob DeGrom in Game 1 of the 2015 National League Division Series.

Game 2

New York leveled the series behind the superb pitching of starter Jon Matlack. Just as in Game 1, pitching dominated Game 2, as lefties Matlack of Mets and Don Gullett of the Reds were near the top of their respective games. A Rusty Staub home run in the fourth inning was the only run through eight innings. After Gullett exited for a pinch hitter in the sixth inning, Clay Carroll shut down the Mets for three innings, but New York put the game away with four runs in the ninth against Reds' relievers Tom Hall and Pedro Borbón. Matlack completed his two-hitter (reserve outfielder Andy Kosco collected both hits, in the second and seventh innings) by retiring the Reds 1–2–3 in the ninth. In a postgame interview, the light-hitting Harrelson said, "He (Matlack) made the Big Red Machine look like me hitting today."

Game 3

During pregame warm-ups, Harrelson was confronted by Reds second baseman Joe Morgan, who told Harrelson that 1973 batting champion and eventual NL MVP, Pete Rose, didn't appreciate Harrelson's Game 2 post-game disparaging comments, saying Harrelson was finding more fault with the Reds rather than giving Matlack credit.

The Mets scored early and often in Game 3, racing out to a 6–0 lead after just two innings. Rusty Staub hit his second homer of the series in the first inning, and the Mets erupted for five more runs in the second, highlighted by yet another homer from Staub, a three-run shot. The Reds scored their runs in the third on a Denis Menke homer and an RBI single by Joe Morgan off Mets starting pitcher Jerry Koosman.

In the top of the fifth with Pete Rose on first, Morgan hit a double play ball to Mets first baseman John Milner, Rose slid hard into Bud Harrelson as he tried unsuccessfully to break up the double play. Harrelson said something to Rose and they began to fight at second as both teams poured onto the field. Order was eventually restored and neither Rose nor Harrelson were ejected. But when Rose returned to his left field position in the bottom of the fifth, fans at Shea Stadium began showering him with debris. Reds manager Sparky Anderson then pulled his team off the field. After a whiskey bottle almost hit Rose, National League president Chub Feeney threatened to force the Mets to declare a forfeit, unless they could calm the fans. Yogi Berra, as well as Willie Mays, Seaver, Staub and Cleon Jones walked out to left field and persuaded fans to stop throwing debris. "Look at the scoreboard!" Mays told them. "We're ahead! Let 'em play the game." The game was completed without any more incidents from either team and the Mets won to take a 2 games to 1 lead.

Game 4

The Reds evened the series behind outstanding pitching and a clutch home run from Pete Rose. The Mets opened the scoring in the third off Reds starter Fred Norman, when Félix Millán singled home Don Hahn. Norman with the help of seven shutout innings from the Reds bullpen, held the Mets to two singles for the rest of the game. The Reds tied the game in the seventh inning on a  Tony Pérez home run. The Reds had scoring threats in the 10th and 11th innings, but couldn't score because of two outstanding catches by Rusty Staub. The latter unfortunately resulted in a severe injury to Staub's right shoulder when he crashed into the right field fence. Then In the 12th, much to the displeasure of the Shea Stadium crowd, Rose hit a tie-breaking homer off Met reliever Harry Parker to give the Reds a 2–1 lead. Pedro Borbón came on to retire the Mets in the bottom of the 12th to even the series at 2–2.

Game 5

A Game 5 victory gave the Mets their second National League pennant in five years, as Tom Seaver pitched New York to victory. The Reds loaded the bases in the top of the first but couldn't score, the Mets took the lead on a two-run single by Ed Kranepool (playing in place of the injured Rusty Staub) in the bottom of the inning. Cincinnati tied the game with single runs in the third and fifth on a sacrifice fly by Dan Driessen and an RBI single by Tony Pérez. The Mets went ahead for good with four runs on four hits in the fifth, capped by a run-scoring single from Bud Harrelson. Seaver scored New York's final run in the sixth when he doubled and came home on a Cleon Jones single. Seaver kept the Reds off the board after the fifth, although closer Tug McGraw came on to get the final two outs for the save after the Reds had loaded the bases in the ninth.

The Mets got just six more hits than the Reds in the series (37-31), but outscored them 23-8. The Mets hit just .220 but the great NY Mets staff held the hard-hitting Reds to a meager .186 team batting average.

NBC interrupted its coverage of the game to report the resignation of Vice President Spiro Agnew after pleading nolo contendere to corruption charges.

Composite line score
1973 NLCS (3–2): New York Mets over Cincinnati Reds

References

External links
 Baseball-reference.com – 1973 NLCS

National League Championship Series
New York Mets postseason
Cincinnati Reds postseason
National League Championship Series
National League Championship Series
1970s in Cincinnati
National League Championship Series
National League Championship Series
Baseball competitions in Cincinnati
Baseball competitions in New York City
1970s in Queens